Colin Frederick Crawford (14 May 1913 – 29 December 2007) was an Australian rules footballer who played with Essendon and Fitzroy in the Victorian Football League (VFL).

Career
Crawford was a rover and wingman, recruited from Essendon Juniors.

He made eight appearances for Essendon in the 1934 VFL season, then in 1935 played 12 league games and represented Victoria against Bendigo.

Crawford got a clearance to Fitzroy in 1936 and debuted for the club in the opening round against Carlton. Crawford, who also kept wicket for the Fitzroy Cricket Club, didn't appear again at VFL level and was granted a clearance to Brunswick mid-season.

A member of Brunswick's 1938 premiership team, Crawford was appointed captain-coach for the 1941 VFA season. Brunswick would fall one win short of making the finals.

References

External links

1913 births
Australian rules footballers from Melbourne
Essendon Football Club players
Fitzroy Football Club players
Brunswick Football Club players
Brunswick Football Club coaches
Fitzroy cricketers
2007 deaths
People from Brunswick, Victoria
Cricketers from Melbourne